is a former Japanese football player.

Playing career
Horii was born in Kofu on July 3, 1975. After graduating from Aoyama Gakuin University, he joined Japan Football League club Ventforet Kofu based in his local in 1998. He played many matches as forward from first season and the club was promoted to new league J2 League from 1999. In 1999, although he played as regular player, the club finished at bottom place. In 2000, he moved to J2 club Montedio Yamagata. He played many matches in 2 seasons and scored 10 goals in 2001. In September 2001, he moved to J1 League club Consadole Sapporo. Although he played many matches until 2002, the club was relegated to J2 from 2003. From 2003, he became a regular player and played many matches until 2004. However his opportunity to play decreased in 2005. In 2006, he moved to newly was promoted to J1 club, Ventforet Kofu for the first time in 7 years. He retired end of 2006 season.

Club statistics

References

External links

1975 births
Living people
Aoyama Gakuin University alumni
Association football people from Yamanashi Prefecture
Japanese footballers
J1 League players
J2 League players
Japan Football League (1992–1998) players
Ventforet Kofu players
Montedio Yamagata players
Hokkaido Consadole Sapporo players
Association football forwards